Stephen Christopher Goodwin (10 March 1967) is a British auto racing driver. Currently he works as Expert High Performance Test Driver for Aston Martin. Additionally he manages the racing career of Bruno Senna and continues to race in International GT Endurance events.
He was also TV commentator on F1 for ESPN Star Sports for nearly ten years and occasionally still appears on EPS&M and other networks such as ITV (GP2 coverage).

Racing career

His early racing was in single-seaters, starting in 1987 with the Formula First Championship. He was featured in the final episode of the 1987 series of Top Gear in which he collided with another competitor. He was Champion of Brands Hatch and finished runner-up in the 1989 Formula Ford Junior Championship, and runner-up again in 1990 when he competed in Formula Renault. He competed in Formula 3000 and Formula Vauxhall in 1991 and 1992 respectively.

In 1993 he drove in two rounds of the British Touring Car Championship for the Ecurie Ecosse Vauxhall Team in a Vauxhall Cavalier. This included an impressive tenth-place finish at the final round at Silverstone. He entered a Cavalier in 1994 as an independent entry for Roy Kennedy Racing, finishing third in the Cup for Privateers despite missing some rounds.

In 1995 and 1996 Chris drove for the factory Lotus GT team in International GT Endurance races.

He worked for McLaren in 1997, competing in both the FIA GT Championship and Le Mans. In 1999 he raced the British GT Championship with a McLaren F1 GTR. Two more years were spent in the British GTs in 1999 and 2000. In 2001 he raced in both the European Le Mans Series winning the GTS class and the ASCAR Championship. He returned to Touring Cars in 2002 driving a Nissan Primera in the European Touring Car Championship.

In 2008, Chris was instrumental in establishing the SLR GT Trophy for the Mercedes Benz SLR McLaren sportscar and finished second in 6 races.

Most recently, Chris has raced in the FIA GT3 Championship, the FIA GT Championship (best result 3rd in GT2 at the Spa 24 Hours) and in GT2 in the International GT Open Championship.

Goodwin, in his role as McLaren Automotive Chief Test Driver, drove the 2008 title-winning MP4-23 Formula One car at the Goodwood Festival of Speed on Friday 3 July 2009.

Goodwin was announced as Expert High Performance Test Driver for Aston Martin on 20 December 2017.

Racing record

Complete British Touring Car Championship results
(key) (Races in bold indicate pole position) (Races in italics indicate fastest lap)

Complete European Touring Car Championship results
(key) (Races in bold indicate pole position) (Races in italics indicate fastest lap)

Complete 24 Hours of Spa results

References

External links
 BTCC Pages Profile.

1967 births
Living people
British Touring Car Championship drivers
British Formula Renault 2.0 drivers
FIA GT Championship drivers
British Formula 3000 Championship drivers
McLaren people
Blancpain Endurance Series drivers
International GT Open drivers
24 Hours of Spa drivers
European Touring Car Championship drivers
British GT Championship drivers
Aston Martin Racing drivers
Ecurie Ecosse drivers
CRS Racing drivers
Nürburgring 24 Hours drivers
McLaren Racing drivers
Le Mans Cup drivers